Dazzy Kapenya (born 22 April 1976) is a retired Zimbabwean football defender. A Zimbabwe international, he played at the 2000 and 2003 COSAFA Cup and the 2004 African Cup of Nations.

References 

1976 births
Living people
Zimbabwean footballers
Zimbabwe international footballers
Association football defenders
Zimbabwean expatriate footballers
Expatriate soccer players in South Africa
Zimbabwean expatriate sportspeople in South Africa
Highlanders F.C. players
Sporting Lions F.C. players
Amazulu F.C. (Zimbabwe) players
Manning Rangers F.C. players